The siege of Székesfehérvár started in the month of August in 1543 when the Ottomans laid siege to the fortress.

Székesfehérvár was a key fortification in the frontier area extending in the western foreground of Budin. In 1543 the garrison numbered 6,000 troops. On 22 August 1543 the Ottomans laid siege to the castle from three directions. On September 2 the Ottomans started a general attack against the fortress, they captured the outer castle. The next day the defenders in the inner castle surrendered to the Ottomans. It was turned into a sanjak of the province of Budin.

References

Battles involving the Ottoman Empire